The British Chambers of Commerce (BCC) was founded in 1860 and is the only business group with members of every size, from every sector, in both every region and nation of the UK and over 70 markets around the world.

Policy and advocacy work
The BCC is the UK's most representative business network, with a network of accredited chambers in every locality in the UK, serving members of every size and sector.

Research
Its flagship Quarterly Economic Survey regularly receives over 7000 responses and is the largest and most representative of its kind in the UK.

Other surveys include the Quarterly International Trade Outlook, the quarterly recruitment outlook, and other more specific research outputs.

Trade facilitation
Chambers of Commerce have supported local businesses with trade documentation, such as certificates of origin and preferential trade documentation, for over 100 years.

The BCC customs brokerage service, ChamberCustoms, is the only customs broker in the UK to offer a ‘one stop shop’ with direct links to all sea, air and road ports and terminals in the UK.

Accreditation
The BCC's system of accreditation is designed to evaluate and improve the performance of accredited Chambers of Commerce.

This system enables those chambers that meet the accreditation requirements to become a member of the BCC Network. A list of accredited Chambers of commerce in the UK can be found here.

Each accredited Chamber is required to display the ‘BCC Accredited’ logo, which provides assurance to businesses that the Chamber has met rigorous and continually updated quality standards.

Annual Conference
The British Chambers of Commerce Annual Conference is a yearly event which is regarded as one of the non-party political conferences, attended by delegates from a range of sectors.

It attracts a large number of senior politicians and business leaders and previous speakers have included the prime minister, the foreign secretary, the chancellor of the exchequer and the leader of the opposition.

Chamber Business Awards
The annual Chamber Business Awards were originally launched in 2004.

Director General
Shevaun Haviland was appointed as Director General in May 2021, replacing Dr Adam Marshall, who had been in post from October 2016.  Previous Director Generals include John Longworth and David Frost.

President
Baroness Ruby McGregor-Smith CBE was elected President of the British Chambers of Commerce in March 2020 for a two-year term, to represent the interests of Chamber business communities and trade.  In 2022, Baroness Martha Lane-Fox was elected as the next President.

Chair
Sarah Howard MBE was elected Chair of the British Chambers of Commerce in October 2019.

Global business network
The British Chambers of Commerce Global Business Network is composed of members of British chambers of commerce and business groups located across all continents of the world, and directly linked to chambers of commerce in every region of the UK.

See also
Confederation of British Industry
Federation of Small Businesses
Make UK
Institute of Directors

References

Foreign trade of the United Kingdom
Chambers of commerce in the United Kingdom
Organisations based in the City of Westminster
Organizations established in 1860
1860 establishments in the United Kingdom